Sofia Dmitrievna Akateva (born 7 July 2007) is a Russian figure skater. She is the 2023 Russian champion. At the junior level, she is the 2021 JGP Russia champion, the 2021 JGP Poland champion, a two-time Russian junior national champion (2021, 2022), and currently holds the junior women's world records for the highest total and free skate scores. 

Akateva is the 11th woman to land a quad jump and the 14th to land a triple Axel in international competition. She is the second woman after American skater Alysa Liu to land a quad jump and triple Axel in one program successfully.

Personal life 
Akatieva was born in Moscow on 7 July 2007. She has a younger brother, Aleksandr. Sonik is a Russian diminutive form of Sofia, so she is affectionately nicknamed Super Soniс by her fans and teammates for her strong technical ability.

Career

Early years 
Akatieva began learning to skate in 2011 as a four-year-old at Sambo 70. She transitioned into the Khrustalnyi rink under her current coach Eteri Tutberidze's group within the Sambo 70 training complex in 2017.

Akatieva began training her first quadruple jump, the quad toe loop, with the support of a harness in December 2018 and the triple Axel in January 2019. She landed her first attempts of both jumps independently in March and April of 2019, respectively.

As a novice and domestic junior skater under Tutberidze, Akatieva placed second at the 2019 Russian Younger Age Championships (Russia's equivalent of a novice national championship) behind her teammate Kamila Valieva. In 2020, she won the silver medal at the 2020 Russian Junior Championships, again behind Valieva, and won her first junior national title the following year at the 2021 edition. During the domestic Cup of Russia series held during the 2020–21 season, Akateva was lauded as the first female skater to land a triple Axel and two quadruple jumps in a program during her free skate.

2021–22 season: International junior debut 
Akatieva made her junior international debut at the 2021 JGP Russia held in Krasnoyarsk in mid-September. At the event, she surpassed teammate Kamila Valieva's junior world record scores for the free program and total combined score and came close to matching teammate Alena Kostornaia's junior world record for the short program to take the title by a comfortable 27 point margin ahead of silver medalist Anastasia Zinina. Across her two programs, Akatieva landed two triple Axels, one in combination, and three quad jumps, the toe loop, and the Salchow, two in combination. She is the first woman to land three quads and a triple Axel in one program.

At her second JGP assignment, the 2021 JGP Poland, Akatieva skated two clean programs, again executing two triple Axels and three quad jumps over the course of the competition to claim the title ahead of compatriot Elizaveta Kulikova and South Korean competitor Shin Ji-a. Due to her results over her two events, Akatieva qualified to the 2021–22 Junior Grand Prix Final as the top-seeded competitor in the junior women's event. Akatieva's results also automatically qualified her a spot in the senior-level 2022 Russian Championships, but she was barred from competing there by the Russian Figure Skating Federation as her birthday fell after the age-eligibility cutoff date.

In February 2022, Akatieva handily won her second consecutive junior national title at the 2022 Russian Junior Championships. She placed first in both segments of competition to take the gold medal by an over 23-point margin ahead of silver medalist Sofia Samodelkina.

2022–23 season: Russian national title 
Akatieva competed on the domestic Russian Grand Prix (in lieu of the ISU Grand Prix, as Russian skaters were banned by the ISU) and competed at the 2023 Russian Figure Skating Championships. She placed first with a total score of 249.74 points ahead of Kamila Valieva and Elizaveta Tuktamysheva.

Programs

Competitive highlights 
JGP: Junior Grand Prix; GPR: Grand Prix of Russia

Records and achievements

Junior world record scores
Akatieva is currently the junior world record holder for the women's free program and total combined score.

• Akatieva is the first woman to land a triple Axel and three quadruple jumps in one program.

Detailed results 
Small medals for short and free programs awarded only at ISU Championships. Personal bests highlighted in bold.
Although she participated in senior level competitions in Russia in the 2022-23 season, she is still considered a junior competitor according to the ISU classification.

Junior level

References

External links 
 

! colspan="3" style="border-top: 5px solid #78FF78;" |World Junior Record Holders

 

2007 births
Living people
Russian female single skaters
Figure skaters from Moscow
21st-century Russian women